Raphaël Calmette (7 July 1901 – 17 March 1981) was a French racing cyclist. He rode in the 1928 Tour de France.

References

1901 births
1981 deaths
French male cyclists
Place of birth missing